Wilson Constantino Novo Estrela (born 13 March 1969), known simply as Wilson, is an Angolan former footballer who played as a central defender.

He also possessed Portuguese nationality, due to the many years spent in the country.

Club career
Wilson was born in Moçâmedes, Portuguese Angola. In a career which spanned exactly two decades, always in Portugal, he represented Caldas SC (twice), S.C. Olhanense, O Elvas CAD, Gil Vicente F.C., C.F. Os Belenenses (having a lengthy Primeira Liga spell with both), A.D. Ovarense and G.C. Alcobaça, the latter in the fourth division.

Wilson retired in 2008, at the age of 39.

International career
Wilson was an Angolan international for 13 years, appearing at the 1996 African Cup of Nations in South Africa. On 14 November 2001, he was one of four Angolan players sent off during a 5–1 friendly loss in Portugal; the game was abandoned after 70 minutes after the Africans were reduced to six men due to injury.

References

External links

1969 births
Living people
People from Namibe Province
Angolan people of Portuguese descent
Angolan footballers
Portuguese footballers
Association football defenders
Primeira Liga players
Liga Portugal 2 players
Segunda Divisão players
Caldas S.C. players
S.C. Olhanense players
O Elvas C.A.D. players
Gil Vicente F.C. players
C.F. Os Belenenses players
A.D. Ovarense players
G.C. Alcobaça players
Angola international footballers
1996 African Cup of Nations players